Spectrobes, known in Japan as , is an action role-playing video game developed by Jupiter and published by Disney Interactive Studios for the Nintendo DS. Disney Interactive Studios has stated that Spectrobes is its first original intellectual property; that is, a game not based on any film or TV program from its parent company.

The game was considered a commercial success and Disney Interactive Studios announced that more than 700,000 copies of the game had shipped worldwide in the first month and it was the best-selling third-party (not published by Nintendo, Microsoft, or Sony) game for March 2007, ranking #7 over all that month.

The game was re-released in November 2007 as part of a special Spectrobes: Collector's Edition bundle, which included the game itself, all thirty-eight input code cards plus two exclusive Geo input cards, and a mini-guide.

Gameplay

Plot 
Out on a routine mission, Nanairo Planetary Patrol Officers Rallen and Jeena respond to a strange distress signal and discover the wreckage of an escape capsule in which an old man has been in a cryogenic sleep for over a decade. Once conscious, the man, whose name is Aldous, relays an unbelievable tale of the attack on his home planet by a vicious horde of creatures known as the Krawl. Rallen, Jeena, and Aldous then set out on a mission to save Nanairo from the destructive planet-eating Krawl.

After fighting the Krawl on five of Nanairo's seven planets, Rallen's boss, Commander Grant, reveals that the Krawl had established a base on the seventh planet, Meido; however, their spaceship is incapable of reaching this planet. Aldous reveals that ancient ruins found on one of the planets are actually a spaceship from an earlier civilization, and that it may be able to reach Meido. After gathering a number of Keystones, they are able to resurrect the spaceship and reach the Meido. After fighting through more hordes of Krawl, Rallen fights a large Krawl called Xelles that has the ability to heal whatever comes near it. After defeating it, Rallen fights a final Leader Krawl and kills it, thus ending the invasion - temporarily.

Nintendo Wi-Fi

Download 
The Download feature allowed the player to use DL (Downloader) Points to purchase video clips, special Spectrobes, custom parts, minerals, and more. The first time the player used the Download system, they were awarded 30 free DL Points. Every following week, the player could obtain ten more DL Points by accessing the download system on Friday, or else the points will not be saved.

Upload 
The Upload feature allows players to upload their Sequence Battle scores from the seven Great Black Holes scattered on the various planets and moons in the Nanairo star system. In Sequence Battle, the player must win a certain number of Krawl battles to obtain the prize: an Evolve Mineral or a special Geo. Before beating the game, only one Great Black Hole is available to the player: in the Area 2 Desert of Nessa. Here, the prize is always an Evolve Mineral. After beating the game, six more Great Black Holes appear throughout Nanairo. The rest of the Geos may be obtained from these black holes.

Reception 

The game received "mixed" reviews according to the review aggregation website Metacritic. In Japan, Famitsu gave it a score of one six, two sevens, and one six for a total of 26 out of 40, while Famitsu DS + Wii gave it a score of one eight and three sevens for a total of 29 out of 40.

Detroit Free Press gave it two stars out of four and said, "The character designs aren't on Pokémons level, but the effort you devote to finding and raising these characters creates a level of attachment even Nintendo hasn't quite achieved." The Sydney Morning Herald gave it a similar score of two-and-a-half stars out of five and said, "Not what you might expect from Disney, Spectrobes is initially refreshing but quickly becomes dull." Anime News Network gave it a D, saying that the game is "not necessarily a terrible game: in fact, it features quite a number of admirable traits. However, it's not a compelling one either. Gamers that have short attention spans and don't mind boring, repetitive gameplay may want to give it a try. However, everyone else will be wise to wait for the next true Pokémon releases to hit the system."

Sequels 
The sequel to Spectrobes, entitled Spectrobes: Beyond the Portals, was released in the U.S. on October 7, 2008. It features a new third-person 3-D field perspective and a map on the top screen. With this sequel, players can choose to play as either Rallen or Jeena. They are also able to play as the Spectrobes themselves when in battle. It was the second game to use Disney's online game and social network service DGamer, the first being The Chronicles of Narnia: Prince Caspian. The third and final game in the series, Spectrobes: Origins, was released for the Wii on August 18, 2009.

Notes

References

External links 
Official Spectrobes Community Site

Spectrobes
Role-playing video games
Jupiter (company) games
Nintendo DS games
Nintendo DS-only games
Nintendo Wi-Fi Connection games
Disney video games
Action role-playing video games
2007 video games
Video games about police officers
Video games developed in Japan
Video games set on fictional planets